The Intergovernmental Group of Twenty-Four on International Monetary Affairs and Development, or The Group of 24 (G-24) was established in 1971 as a chapter of the Group of 77 in order to help coordinate the positions of developing countries on international monetary and development finance issues, as well as and to ensure that their interests are adequately represented in negotiations on international monetary matters. Though originally named after the number of founding Member States, it now has 28 Members (plus China, which acts as a Special Invitee). Although the G-24 officially has 28 member countries, any member of the G-77 can join discussions.

Although the group is not an organ of the International Monetary Fund, the IMF provides secretariat services for the Group. It meets biannually, first prior to the International Monetary and Financial Committee, and secondly prior to the Joint Ministerial Committee of the Boards of Governors of the Bank and the Fund. These meetings allow developing country members to discuss agenda items prior to these important meetings of the IMF/World Bank.

Member States

Following is the list of members of G-24:

Region I (Africa):
 
 
 
 
 
 
  
 
 
 
 
  
Region II (Latin America and the Caribbean): 
 
 
 
 
 
 
 
 
 
  Venezuela

Region III (Asia):

Observers
The following act as observers states of the G-24:
 
 
 
 

The following act as institutional observers of the G-24:
 Arab Monetary Fund
 Economic Commission for Latin America and the Caribbean
 Group of 77
 International Labour Organization
 Islamic Development Bank
 OPEC Fund for International Development
 Organization of the Petroleum Exporting Countries
 South Centre
 United Nations Conference on Trade and Development
 United Nations Department of Economic and Social Affairs
 Central American Monetary Council

Operation of the G-24 
The G-24 operates at two levels:

 The political level, consisting of Ministers, their Deputies, the Bureau, and other Washington-based representatives who participate in the Committee of the Whole and in any ad hoc meetings; and
 The operational level, which is run by the G-24 Liaison Office, and includes the G-24 Secretariat and the Research Coordinator.

The governing body of the G-24 meets twice a year, preceding the Spring and Fall meetings of the International Monetary and Financial Committee and the Joint Development Committee of the World Bank and the International Monetary Fund. The plenary G-24 meetings are addressed by the heads of the IMF and the World Bank Group as well as by senior officials of the UN system. Issues are first discussed by the Deputies and culminate at the Ministerial level by the approval of a document that sets out the consensus views of member countries. The Ministerial document is released as a public Communiqué at a press conference held at the end of the meetings. Decision-making within the G-24 is by consensus.

Research and publications 
The Group also maintains a research and work program that revolves around issues of importance to developing countries. In particular, the program focuses on three key areas: The global economy and growth agenda, international financial architecture, and financing for development. The global economy and growth agenda emphasizes structural transformation, trade and technology, and inequality. international financial architecture covers reform and governance of global financial institutions, the global financial safety net and managing capital flows, and financial regulation. financing for development includes taxation and international tax cooperation, infrastructure financing, debt management and sustainability, and financial inclusion. Much of the group's research, including books, policy briefs and working papers can be found on its website.

Leadership
The following compose the leadership of the Group:
 Chair: Adama Coulibaly, Minister of Finance, Côte d'Ivoire 
 First Vice-:  Benjamin E. Diokno, Secretary of Finance, Philippines
Second Vice-: [ Argentina

Chairs of the G-24
The following is the list of former and current Chairs of the G-24:

References

External links

Official site
 

G7 summits
Organizations established in 1971